Light (Chinese: 光) is the debut album by Chinese singer-songwriter Xu Weizhou. The album was released on 1 May 2016. It consists of 7 songs. Most of the songs were composed by Xu Weizhou himself and also contributed in writing lyrics. After the album release, he conducted his "First Light Asia Tour" around various Asian countries.

Background
Light consists of various genres such as ballad and pop-rock with a mix of rap. Most of the songs were composed by Xu himself and also contributed to lyrical writing.  Xu revealed that the two songs "Understand Dream" and "I Remember Your Eyes" were first composed by him when he was 17 years old and "Dust" was given to him by a friend. The two soundtracks, "Walk Slowly" and "Because of the Sea" of a web series Addicted he starred on was also included in his album.

Promotion and release
Xu pre-released some songs in his album at Sina Weibo. The first one was "Walk Slowly" on 1 March, followed by "Dust" on 9 March, "Moonlight" on 21 March, "I Remember Your Eyes" on 28 March  and "Understand Dream on 10 May but the whole album was officially released on 1 May 2016. He performed "Walk Slowly" and "Because of the Sea" live for the first time on Addicted fan meeting held in Beijing, "Dust" on 16th Top Chinese Music Awards and "Light" on 2nd Addicted fan meeting held in Bangkok. Later, he performed "Light" again on 2016 Fresh Asia Music Awards and 24th Oriental Billboard Award Ceremony.

In February 2017, iFASHION published a short clip music video of "Light" for Xu's photoshoot. Later in March, he released the documentary of his "First Light Asia Tour" entitled "Shadow of Light" which included behind the scenes of his concert tours.

Commercial performance
The album has sold over 10,000 copies within 15 minutes; 2,920 and 7,089 copies on standard and deluxe edition, respectively. The deluxe edition contains a photo book, poster and a shirt designed by Xu himself. It was also revealed that the tickets on his first concert to Beijing were sold out within 3 minutes while the VIP tickets to Bangkok were sold out within 35 seconds. Xu conducted his "First Light Asia Tour" around June to August at Seoul, Bangkok and 3 other cities in China and participated in music festivals afterwards.

Xu was the first solo artist from Mainland China to hold a concert in South Korea and also won several awards of "Best New Artist" after his concert tours. In 2017, "Walk Slowly" won an award of "Top Ten Golden Songs" during MTV Global Chinese Music Awards night.

Live concerts

First Light Asia Tour

Music Festivals 

On 9 December 2017, Xu held another concert in Shanghai entitled Light 2017. He performed "Understand the Dream", "I Remember Your Eyes", "Dust", "Because of the Sea", "Walk Slowly" and all his songs from the first two quarters as well as a new song from the third quarter of his second album The Time. All tickets were sold out within 30 seconds.

Track listing

Chart performance
The song "Light" was included in "Top 20 Hit Songs For First Half Of 2016" according to Global Chinese Golden Chart and "Top 20 Most Favorite Songs of 2016" according to Music Radio China Chart. In addition, "Walk Slowly" ranked 1st on the yinyue 39th issue while “Dust” and “MoonLight” both ranked 3rd on the 40th and 42nd issue, respectively.

Weekly

References

2016 debut albums